Alpha Books, a member of Penguin Random House, is an American publisher best known for its Complete Idiot's Guides series. It began as a division of Macmillan. Pearson Education acquired Macmillan General Reference from Simon & Schuster in 1999. Alpha moved from Pearson Education to Penguin Group in 2003. Alpha became part of sister company DK in 2012.

, the Complete Idiot's Guides contains over 120 books.

References

External links
 Alpha Books at Penguin Group (USA)

Book publishing companies based in New York (state)
Penguin Random House
Publishing companies established in 1991
1991 establishments in New York (state)